Didi Abuli is one of the highest peak of the Lesser Caucasus Mountains in the nation of Georgia. Didi Abuli is an extinct stratovolcano

External links 
 

Mountains of Georgia (country)
Mountains of Samtskhe-Javakheti region